Boffalora sopra Ticino is a comune (municipality) in the Metropolitan City of Milan in the Italian region Lombardy, located about  west of Milan.

Boffalora sopra Ticino borders the following municipalities: Marcallo con Casone, Bernate Ticino, Magenta, Trecate, Cerano.

History

Boffalora sopra Ticino was the site of a small battle in the 1859 Second Italian War of Independence. It was one of the first locations in what had been up to then Austrian territory to be captured by a French army which crossed the Ticino after the Battle of Montebello.

Notable people
Alfredo Colombo, footballer
 Luigi Magnotti, cyclist

References

External links
 Official website

Cities and towns in Lombardy